Podranea is a genus of one or two species of African flowering vines in the family Bignoniaceae.

The native range of this genus is southern tropical Africa and southern Africa. It is found in Malawi, Mozambique, Zambia, Zimbabwe and also the Cape Provinces and KwaZulu-Natal in South Africa.

The genus name of Podranea is derived from anagram of Pandorea. As the genus was separated out from the other Bignoniaceae genus. 

The genus was circumscribed by Thomas Archibald Sprague in Fl. Cap. (Harvey) vol.4 (2.3) on page 449 in 1904.

Species
Podranea brycei is sometimes considered to be a synonym of Podranea ricasoliana, one of the two species in the genus. The Plant List accepts two species:

References

Bignoniaceae
Bignoniaceae genera
Flora of the Cape Provinces
Flora of KwaZulu-Natal
Flora of South Tropical Africa